James McVinnie (born 13 January 1983) is an English organist and pianist.

His work as a performer encompasses music from the 16th century to the present day. He has collaborated with many leading figures in new music including Philip Glass, Tom Jenkinson/Squarepusher, Angelique Kidjo, Nico Muhly, Martin Creed, David Lang, Richard Reed Parry, Bryce Dessner and Darkstar, many of whom have written large scale works for him.

James McVinnie is a member of Icelandic record label Bedroom Community. Cycles, his debut recording of music written for him by Nico Muhly, was released on this label in 2013. An album of music by Philip Glass, The Grid, was released on Orange Mountain Music in 2018. An album of music by Tom Jenkinson/Squarepusher was released on Warp Records in September 2019 recorded at the organ of Royal Festival Hall, London.

James McVinnie was Assistant Organist of Westminster Abbey between 2008 and 2011. Prior to this appointment, he held similar positions at St Paul's Cathedral, St Albans Cathedral, and Clare College, Cambridge, where he studied music. His teachers were Sarah Baldock, Thomas Trotter and Hans Fagius. He made his debut at London's Royal Festival Hall in March 2014, giving one of the six reopening recitals on the refurbished iconic 1954 Harrison & Harrison organ. He made his solo debut in the Salzburg Festival at age 26 performing with the Freiburg Baroque Orchestra under Ivor Bolton.

Discography
 All Night Chroma  (2019) - Warp Records
 Philip Glass: The Grid (2018) - Orange Mountain Music
 Cycles_1 (2017) - Bedroom Community
 Handel: Saul (live on DVD from Glyndebourne, 2017) - Opus Arte
 Cycles (2013) - Bedroom Community
 Baroque (2012) - Bedroom Community
 I was glad: Sacred choral music of Stanford and Parry (2012) - Vivat
 Allegri: Miserere & the music of Rome (2010) - Hyperion records
 Handel: Theodora (live on DVD from Salzburg Festival, 2009) - Naxos
 Ralph Vaughan Williams: Mass in G minor (2009) - Naxos
 John Taverner: Ex Maria Virgine (2008) - Naxos 
 S S Wesley: Organ Works (2007) - Naxos
 S S Wesley: Choral Works (2006) - Naxos
 Voices: Music by Tarik O'Regan (2005) - Collegium
 John Rutter: Mass of the Children (2005) - Naxos
 Lo the full final sacrifice (2003) - Lammas

References

Living people
English organists
British male organists
Musicians from Kent
21st-century organists
21st-century British male musicians
1983 births